Luttrellstown Castle, dating from the early 15th century (c. 1420), is located in Clonsilla on the outskirts of Dublin, Ireland. It has been owned variously by the eponymous and notorious Luttrell family, by the bookseller Luke White and his descendants Baron Annaly, by the Guinness family, the Primwest Group, and since 2006, by JP McManus, John Magnier and Aidan Brooks.
The castle has hosted visits by Queen Victoria in 1844 and 1900, and its media profile was raised when Victoria Adams married David Beckham there on 4 July 1999. The demesne's current owners have converted Woodlands into a 5-star resort.

Demesne

Luttrellstown Demesne originally comprised the entirety of the townland of "Woodlands" in the civil parish of Clonsilla. Today, Luttrellstown Castle Resort and its remaining  demesne currently form a 5-star resort, with a golf course, country club and unique location just outside the city boundaries of Dublin. A stream rising near the townland of Pass-If-You-Can 
enters an aqueduct in the townland of Westmanstown and passes under the Royal Canal before entering the north-western corner of the demesne. Within the walls of the demesne, the waters are dammed to form a chain of artificial ponds. The stream exits the south-eastern corner of the demesne at a gate lodge on the Strawberry Beds, passing under the road before falling into the River Liffey 25m later.

Owners

The Luttrell family
The demesne and adjoining lands were granted to Sir Geoffrey de Luterel about 1210 by King John of England.  Sir Geoffrey served as the king's minister on many missions of state to Ireland from 1204 to 1216. He was the ancestor of the Luttrells of Dunster Castle in Somersetshire, England. The family became the biggest landowners in the district by the 17th century. Robert Luttrell was treasurer of St Patrick's Cathedral and Lord Chancellor of Ireland from 1235 to 1245, and married into the Plunkett family.

The castle was started by Sir Geoffrey Luttrell, the 5th Lord Luttrell, who was born about 1385. Sir Thomas Luttrell was Chief Justice of the Irish Common Pleas, 1534-1554, and actively involved in the dissolution of the monasteries. He acquired the lands of St Mary's Abbey at Coolmine.

Colonel Henry Luttrell, (born about 1655, died 22 October 1717), the second son of Thomas Luttrell of Luttrellstown, was an Anglo-Irish soldier. He was suspected of betraying the Irish leader Patrick Sarsfield, either by his precipitate withdrawal of his Jacobite troops or by giving the army of King William III of England strategic information about a ford of a river, leading to the loss of the Battle of Aughrim in 1691. After the Siege of Limerick, Luttrell brought his regiment into the Williamite cause. For this act, he was rewarded with the forfeited estates of his elder brother, Simon Luttrell, including Luttrellstown, and was made a major general in the Dutch army. He was assassinated in his sedan chair outside his townhouse in Stafford Street, Dublin, in October 1717.

Colonel Simon Luttrell, 1st Earl of Carhampton (1713–14 January 1787), was an Irish nobleman who became a politician at Westminster. He was the second son of Colonel Henry Luttrell of Luttrellstown and became Lord Lieutenant of County Dublin.

Henry Lawes Luttrell, 2nd Earl of Carhampton (born 1743, died 1821) was the son of Simon, 6th Lord Luttrell of Luttrellstown.  He served as a Member of Parliament for Bossiney in 1768, and subsequently was Adjutant General of Ireland, where he became notorious for his role in suppressing the Irish Rebellion of 1798.  He was so hated that he sold Luttrellstown Castle in 1800, but in a revenge attack, the grave of his grandfather Colonel Henry Luttrell (died 1717) was opened and the skull smashed. His 'popularity' in Ireland is encapsulated by an incident in which the Dublin Post of 2 May 1811 reported his death. Luttrell demanded a retraction, which the newspaper printed, but it appeared under the headline Public Disappointment. Luttrell was an absentee landlord who also owned an estate in the West Indies but resided at Painshill Park in Surrey, England.

His sister Anne Luttrell (1742-1808), considered, and written about, as one of the great beauties of the ages. Anne was first married to a commoner, Christopher Horton (or Houghton) of Catton Hall, on 4 August 1765.

She later married Prince Henry, Duke of Cumberland and Strathearn, the sixth child of Frederick, Prince of Wales, and Augusta of Saxe-Gotha, and a younger brother of King George III. Their marriage took place at Hertford Street in Mayfair, London on 2 October 1771.

King George III did not approve of the marriage, as Anne was a commoner and previously married. Due to this, he later had the Royal Marriages Act 1772 passed to prevent any descendant of George II marrying without the consent of the sovereign, a law which remained in effect until the passage of the Succession to the Crown Act 2013, which, in addition to several other modifications, limited the requirement to obtain royal consent to only the first six persons in line to the throne (rather than all descendants).

Luke White
Henry Lawes Luttrell sold Luttrellstown to publisher Luke White, described as one of the most remarkable men that Ireland produced and ancestor of Lord Annaly. Luke White changed the name to Woodlands to eradicate the name of Luttrell, but his great-grandson, 3rd Lord Annaly, reverted it to Luttrell Castle.

In 1778 Luke White started as an impecunious book dealer, buying in Dublin and reselling around the country.  By 1798, during the rebellion, he helped the Irish government with a loan of 1 million pounds (at £65 per £100 share at 5%).  He became M.P. for Leitrim, and died in 1824 leaving properties worth £175,000 per annum.

Lord Annaly
Eventually the estate devolved to his fourth son who was created Lord Annaly, peer of the United Kingdom.

Visits by Queen Victoria
Queen Victoria first visited Luttrellstown in 1844 en route to the Duke of Leinster at Carton House. In 1900, en route to the Viceregal Lodge she drank a cup of tea near the waterfall, an event commemorated by Lord Annaly with an obelisk made of six granite blocks from the Dublin mountains.

Ernest Guinness
In 1927 the estate was bought by Ernest Guinness, as a wedding present for his daughter, Aileen Guinness, who married a cousin, Brinsley Sheridan Plunket. Aileen Plunket entertained on a grand scale. The castle became the site of hunt balls and other lavish social events. Her niece, Lady Caroline Blackwood wrote of growing up in that atmosphere in her book, Great Granny Webster.

Private consortia

In 1983 it was sold to the private Swiss consortium Primwest, and in 2006, it was bought by JP McManus and John Magnier. In 2007, more than €20 million was spent on major upgrade work, including improvements to the Steel- and Mackenzie-designed championship golf course and the "alpine style" clubhouse.

References and footnotes

External links
 Luttrell Genealogy
 Luttrellstown Castle official web site
 The Luttrells in Ireland

Castles in Fingal
Hotels in Fingal
Buildings listed on the Fingal Record of Protected Structures